Evelyn "Champagne" King (born July 1, 1960) is an American singer, songwriter, and record producer. She is best known for her hit disco single "Shame", which was released in 1977 during the height of disco's popularity. King had other hits from the early through the mid–1980s including; "I'm in Love" (1981), "Love Come Down" (1982) and "Your Personal Touch" (1985).

Biography
Evelyn King was born on July 1, 1960, in New York, New York, and raised in Philadelphia, Pennsylvania. She is one of eight children. King's childhood nickname was "Bubbles." Her uncle Avon Long had played the part of Sportin' Life in the first Broadway revival of Porgy and Bess and worked with Lena Horne at the Cotton Club. Her father sang back-up for groups at Harlem's Apollo Theater. Her mother managed a group called Quality Red.

King was discovered as a young woman while working with her mother at Philadelphia International Records as an office cleaner. Producer Theodore T. Life overheard her singing in a washroom and began coaching her. She was eventually signed to a production deal with Life's Galaxy Productions and a recording contract with RCA Records.

In 1990, King married smooth jazz guitarist Freddie Fox. In 1997, she lost three family members to various illnesses. In 1987 her daughter Johnniea was born with brain damage and other health problems, dying two years later.

Career
At the beginning of her career the name Evelyn King sounded "too grown-up" so the name "Champagne" was added. King released her debut studio album, Smooth Talk, in 1977. It included the song "Shame", which is her only top-ten on the Billboard Hot 100, peaking at No. 9; the song also reached No. 7 Soul and No. 8 on the dance chart. The record was eventually certified gold. Another single from that album, "I Don't Know If It's Right", peaked at No. 23 on the Billboard Hot 100 and No. 7 Soul; it would become her second certified gold single. In 1981, the single "I'm in Love" was released from the same-titled album; it reached No. 1 on the R&B singles chart and dance chart in August of that year; it also peaked at No. 40 on the pop chart.

In 1982, King released the album, Get Loose. It yielded a top-twenty pop and #1 Soul hit with the single, "Love Come Down". The song also peaked at No. 1 on the dance chart and reached the UK Singles Chart top-ten, peaking at No. 7 for three weeks. The follow-up, "Betcha She Don't Love You", peaked at No. 2 on the Soul chart and No. 49 on the pop chart. From the mid- to late-1980s, King would continue to chart on the Soul chart, placing eight singles in the Soul top-twenty, with three making it to the top-ten.

On September 20, 2004, King's "Shame" became one of the first records to be inducted into the Dance Music Hall of Fame at a ceremony held in New York's Spirit club.

Health crisis, and subsequent return to music
In 2006, King had a uterine fibroid for which she had to be resuscitated for after she had stopped breathing. She said that it was akin to "having a baby inside" of her.

On August 14, 2007, King released her first studio album in 12 years, Open Book.  It featured the single "The Dance", which peaked at No. 12 on the Hot Dance Club Play Chart. In 2011, King also collaborated with deep house producer Miguel Migs, on the track "Everybody", which was included on his album Outside the Skyline. "Everybody" was released as a single on July 19, 2011.

In 2015, King formed a supergroup with disco singers Martha Wash and Linda Clifford called First Ladies of Disco. The group released its debut single "Show Some Love" in March 2015, which peaked at number six on the Dance charts. The group embarked on its first tour together in 2017. In December 2017, King left the group.

Discography

Studio albums

Compilations
 The Best of Evelyn "Champagne" King (1990, RCA)
 Love Come Down: The Best of Evelyn "Champagne" King (1993, RCA)
 Let's Get Funky (1997, BMG)
 Greatest Hits (2001, RCA)
 Platinum & Gold Collection (2003, BMG Heritage)
 Legends (2005, Sony BMG)
 If You Want My Lovin''' (2006, Sony Music Special Products)
 Action: The Evelyn "Champagne" King Anthology - 1977-1986 (2014, BBR)
 The Essential Evelyn "Champagne" King (2015, Legacy)
 The Complete RCA Hits and More!'' (2016, Real Gone Music)

Singles

See also
 List of number-one dance hits (United States)
 List of artists who reached number one on the US Dance chart

References

External links
 
 
 

1960 births
Living people
21st-century American singers
21st-century American women singers
African-American women singers
American women pop singers
American rhythm and blues singers
American contraltos
American disco singers
American boogie musicians
American soul singers
American women in electronic music
People from the Bronx
Musicians from Philadelphia
Post-disco musicians
RCA Records artists
EMI Records artists
Manhattan Records artists